Xtreme Swing is a thrill ride located at Valleyfair in Shakopee, Minnesota.

Specifications 
Xtreme Swing is a Screamin' Swing type ride built by S&S Worldwide. The ride lasts about one minute, and can accommodate 800 passengers per hour. Riders must be  or taller. Riders are restrained by a lap bar.

See also
 Skyhawk, a similar ride that opened at Cedar Point the same year

References

External links
Official page

Amusement rides manufactured by S&S – Sansei Technologies
Valleyfair
Amusement rides introduced in 2006
Cedar Fair attractions